Karl Eduard Aeschlimann (17 February 1808 in Burgdorf; † 4. April 1893 in Yalta) was a Swiss architect. He was a court architect of the Russian royal family.

Aeschlimann was a son of the potter Johann Heinrich Aeschlimann and his wife Marie. He attended the Burgerschulen in Burgdorf and the Académie des Beaux-Arts in Paris and worked as assistant to architects in the city of Bern. In 1828 he traveled to the Black Sea and ended up in Crimea. He was a traveling companion of the Spanish Count Orlando de la Blanca. Between about 1830 to 1860 he worked as court architect of the Russian royal family on the south coast of Crimea, especially in the district of Greater Yalta. For this area, he created a general plan and designed a number of private and public buildings, including the first hotel of Yalta. Aeshlimann was involved in construction of the castle in Alupka for the Vorontsov family.

Aeschlimann married Elisa Maurer, a daughter of Johann Jakob Maurer-Fischer of Schaffhausen, in Simferopol in 1836 and was knighted in 1850.

Literature 
 Helena A. Aeschlimann: Die Burgdorfer Familie Aeschlimann in Russland. In: Burgdorfer Jahrbuch, 60 (1993), S. 59–89.

References

1808 births
1893 deaths
People from Burgdorf, Switzerland
Swiss emigrants to the Russian Empire
19th-century Swiss architects